Ford is a small village in the north-west of Wiltshire, England. The village is on the A420 road, 4 miles west of Chippenham and 11 miles east of Bristol.

Ford is the second largest village in the civil parish of North Wraxall,  a collection of five settlements which includes Upper Wraxall, North Wraxall, The Shoe (also on the A420) and Mountain Bower. There is a pub called the White Hart, but no other shops.

The Bybrook River flows through the village.

A church of St John was designed by C.E. Ponting in 1896 and converted into a residence in 2001.

References

External links

Villages in Wiltshire